Eva Melander (born 25 December 1974) is a Swedish actress. She has appeared in over a dozen feature films and TV-series. Melander gained significant attention for the starring role of Tina in the 2018 dark fantasy drama Border, which was selected as the Swedish entry for the Academy Awards competition for Best Foreign Film.

Selected filmography
Flocking (2015)
Border (2018)
Charter (2020)

References

External links

Living people
Swedish actresses
Best Actress Guldbagge Award winners
Best Supporting Actress Guldbagge Award winners
1974 births